Mohamad Kasebi (born 1951) is an Iranian actor and film director.

Kasebi was one of the founders of "Art Bureau of Islamic Propagation Organization" in 1979, in which he acted in many films and plays. After a few short films, he made his first feature film Swimming in Winter (1989) as writer and director. He was awarded for his performance in The Father from Fajr Intl. Film Festival

Biography 
Mohammad Kasbi was born on Saturday, June 25, 1961, in Abshar Alley, Rey Street, Tehran. Received in 1350.

Mohammad Kasbi started his almost semi-professional theatrical activity with the theater group at the age of thirteen in the South Youth Palace in Railway Square.

He participated in the entrance exam in 1350 and was accepted in the field of medicine, but due to his interest in studying theater at the Faculty of Fine Arts, he gave up medicine and went to the army in 1351.

In 1974, after returning from the army, he participated in the entrance exam again and was accepted in the field of acting and directing cinema and theater and entered the Faculty of Dramatic Arts.

Mohammad Kasbi did his dubbing before studying and during that time at the Drama College. During his college days, he played many plays, including "A Long Play" directed by Jafar Vali, "Mada" directed by Manizheh Moamedi, "Moonlight for the Deprived" directed by Shahnaz Jaberizadeh, "Scarecrows at Night", "Carol", He played "Passengers", "Sing in the Fog", "The World's Best Dad", "Spider" and و. Mohammad Kasbi was in the last year of the School of Dramatic Arts when the revolution won.

After the revolution, the first play that went on the stage was the work of the students of the Drama College, in which Mohammad Kasbi was also a member and in which he played a role. "Letter Movement" was written by Martyr Hossein Qashqaei and directed by Davood Daneshvar.

Mohammad Kasbi founded the Islamic Thought and Art Center with some friends in early 1979, which was later renamed the "Art Center". He also founded the Performing Arts Center of the Ministry of Guidance. From the middle of 1981, the dubbing work, the management of the radio show unit and the responsibility of the Center for the Performing Arts left everyone and he devoted all his time and focus to the field of art and the beginning of filmmaking for the field.

Mohammad Kasbi has also written several plays, including the published plays "Leech" and "Archive". He also won the festival. In addition to all his responsibilities, he has written and directed several screenplays, such as the screenplay "Swimming in Winter", which received a commendation from the Teacher Festival. He has also written the films "Aphids" and "Messenger" and several other screenplays that have been approved by the Ministry of Guidance and these screenplays have been provided to the Farabi Cinema Foundation and the General Directorate of Experimental Cinema of the Ministry of Guidance. The script is "Home". He wrote a number of other screenplays that he never submitted.

In addition to acting in the field of art, Mohammad Kasbi was also engaged in other activities.

Other activities 

 Theater director of the Arts Department
 Member of the Theater Council of the Academy of Arts
 Member of the licensing council for showing special films
 Member of the Screenwriting Council of the Farabi Cinema Foundation
 Member of the Film Review and Licensing Council of the Ministry of Guidance

Records 

 Responsible for radio shows
 Launching the Center for Performing Arts
 One of the founders of the field of art
 Management of the theater unit of the artistic field
 Establishing and managing the affairs of the cities of the field of art to establish and launch the fields of art in the whole country.
 Member of the Ministry of Guidance Film Review and Licensing Council
 Member of the licensing council for showing special films
 Member of the Screenwriting Council of the Farabi Cinema Foundation
 Judge in all prestigious theater and film festivals in the country, including Fajr Theater Festival, Isfahan Children and Adolescent Film Festival, Resistance Theater, Holy Defense Film, Street Theater, Student Theater throughout the country
 Several times judge of film and TV series festival, secretary of Holy Defense Cinema Festival
 Secretary of the Holy Defense Theater Festival
 Membership in the Theater Council of the Academy of Arts

Awards and honors 

 Candidate for Crystal Simorgh for Badouk
 Candidate for Crystal Simorgh for Wall Film
 Get Crystal Simorgh for Father movie
 Received the statuette of the best actor of Asian cinema from Malaysia in 1997 for the film "Father"
 Receive a commendation plaque for the best play from the fifth festival of choosing the best book of sacred defense for the play "Archive"
 Receive a commendation plaque for the best screenplay from the Teacher Festival for the screenplay "Swimming in Winter"
 Received a certificate of appreciation from the fifth festival for selecting the best book of sacred defense for the play "Archive"

Filmography

Cinematic 
Without Permission, 2012
 Boycott, 1985
 Refugee, 1993
 Attack to H3, 1994
 The Red Circle, 1995
 The Spouse
 The Inverted World, 1997
Saint Mary (Iranian film), 2000
 Good comrades (2015)
 The Eighth Sky (2010)
 Come closer (2009) is not mentioned in the title
 Influence (2008)
 Wall (2007)
 Nima Yoshij (2006)
 Doll (2005)
 Baby I'm not Cook (2001)
 Holy Mary (1997)
 Inverted World (1997)
 Ambush (1997)
 Shades of the Sun (1995)
 Father (1996)
 Red Circle (1995)
 Moon and Sun (1995)
 Attack on H3 (1995)
 Refugee (1995)
 Companion (1987)
 Crisis (1987)
 Boycott (1985)
 Two Eyes Biso (1983)
 Repentance of Nasuh (1982)
 Another Death (1982)

References

External links

 
 

1951 births
Living people
People from Tehran
Iranian male actors
Iranian male film actors
University of Tehran alumni
Iranian male television actors
Crystal Simorgh for Best Actor winners